Chryseobacterium vietnamense  is a Gram-negative and strictly aerobic bacteria from the genus of Chryseobacterium which has been isolated from forest soil in Vietnam.

References

Further reading

External links
Type strain of Chryseobacterium vietnamense at BacDive -  the Bacterial Diversity Metadatabase

vietnamense
Bacteria described in 2012